The 2018–19 Men's Hockey Series was the inaugural season of the Hockey Series, a field hockey championship for men's national teams. The tournament started in June 2018 and finished in June 2019.

Format
The Hockey Series was open to all national teams that were not playing in the Pro League.

The Hockey Series took place in two rounds, the Open and the Finals. The nine highest-ranked teams in the FIH World Rankings (as of 9 June 2017) skipped the Open and advance directly to the Finals. All other national teams played in the Hockey Series Open, which featured eight regional events with up to six teams each. Fifteen teams qualified from the Hockey Series Open to the FIH Series Finals, for a total of 24 teams in the Finals. Those teams played in three events, with eight teams per event (three automatic qualifiers and five that advanced from the Open).

The top two placed teams in each of the Finals events qualified for the 2019 FIH Olympic Qualifiers. In this qualification event, they were joined by the top four placed teams from the Pro League, and the four highest ranked teams not already qualified. The teams will be drawn and play a two-legged tie to determine seven qualified nations for the Olympic Games.

Schedule

Hockey Series Open

FIH Series Finals

The pools and venues were announced on 23 October 2018 with three teams still to qualify. The final pools were confirmed on 21 January 2019.

See also
2018–19 Women's Hockey Series
2019 Men's FIH Pro League

Notes

References

 
Hockey Series
Hockey Series
Hockey Series